Gbaya may refer to:
Gbaya people
Gbaya languages
Gbaya, Guinea, a community in Nzérékoré Prefecture